The Monte Ceneri Tunnel may refer to:

 The Monte Ceneri Rail Tunnel, a rail tunnel under the Monte Ceneri Pass in the Swiss canton of Ticino and comprising two bores:
 The Monte Ceneri I Tunnel
 The Monte Ceneri II Tunnel
 The Monte Ceneri Road Tunnel, a motorway tunnel under the Monte Ceneri Pass in the Swiss canton of Ticino

See also 
 The Ceneri Base Tunnel, a rail tunnel under construction at a lower level under the Monte Ceneri Pass in the Swiss canton of Ticino